The 1992 Nigerian Senate election in Enugu State was held on July 4, 1992, to elect members of the Nigerian Senate to represent Enugu State. Ben-Collins Ndu representing Enugu Central and Fidelis Okoro representing Enugu North won on the platform of National Republican Convention, while Polycarp Nwite representing Enugu East won on the platform of the Social Democratic Party.

Overview

Summary

Results

Enugu Central 
The election was won by Ben-Collins Ndu of the National Republican Convention.

Enugu North 
The election was won by Fidelis Okoro of the National Republican Convention.

Enugu East 
The election was won by Polycarp Nwite of the Social Democratic Party.

References 

Enu
Enugu State Senate elections
July 1992 events in Nigeria